Chairul Saleh Dt Paduko Rajo (September 13, 1916 – February 8, 1967) was born in Sawahlunto, West Sumatra. He was an Indonesian government minister and vice prime minister during the Sukarno presidency. He was a close confidant of Sukarno, whom he had helped persuade to declare Indonesian independence in 1945. He lived in the Netherlands from 1952–1953, but returned to Indonesia after being expelled. He joined Sukarno’s circle of advisers in 1955.

One week before the abortive coup on 30 September 1965, Saleh went to China with a delegation of 45 to celebrate China's national day on 1 October. He is buried in Karet Bivak Cemetery, Central Jakarta.

References
 https://web.archive.org/web/20091027085922/http://geocities.com/forumleuven/artikel/chairul.html
 Ricklefs (1982), A History of Modern Indonesia, Macmillan Southeast Asian reprint,

Notes

Minangkabau people
Sukarno
Speakers of the People's Consultative Assembly
1916 births
1967 deaths
People from Sawahlunto
Government ministers of Indonesia
Grand Crosses with Star and Sash of the Order of Merit of the Federal Republic of Germany